The 2009 All-Big 12 Conference football team consists of American football players chosen as All-Big 12 Conference players for the 2009 Big 12 Conference football season.  The conference recognizes two official All-Big 12 selectors: (1) the Big 12 conference coaches selected separate offensive and defensive units and named first- and second-team players (the "Coaches" team); and (2) a panel of sports writers and broadcasters covering the Big 12 also selected offensive and defensive units and named first- and second-team players (the "Media" team).

Offensive selections

Quarterbacks
 Colt McCoy, Texas (Coaches-1; Media-1)
 Jerrod Johnson, Texas A&M (Coaches-2)

Running backs
 Daniel Thomas, Kansas State (Coaches-1; Media-1)
 Keith Toston, Oklahoma State (Coaches-1)
 Bryant Ward, Oklahoma State (Coaches-1)
 Roy Helu Jr., Nebraska (Coaches-2)
 DeMarco Murray, Oklahoma (Coaches-2)

Centers
 Reggie Stephens, Iowa State (Media-1)
 Jacob Hickman, Nebraska (Media-2)

Offensive Line
 Brandon Carter, Texas Tech (Coaches-1; Media-1)
 Russell Okung, Oklahoma State (Coaches-1; Media-1)
 Trent Williams, Oklahoma (Coaches-1; Media-1)
 Nick Stringer, Kansas State (Coaches-1; Media-2)
 Adam Ulatoski, Texas (Coaches-2; Media-1)
 Nate Solder, Colorado (Coaches-1)
 Kurtis Gregory, Missouri (Coaches-2; Media-2)
 J.D. Walton, Baylor (Coaches-2)
 Chris Hall, Texas (Coaches-2)
 Brody Eldridge, Oklahoma (Coaches-2)
 Lee Grimes, Texas A&M (Coaches-2)
 Kelechi Osemele, Iowa State (Media-2)
 Charlie Tanner, Texas (Media-2)

Tight ends
 Jeron Mastrud, Kansas State (Coaches-1)
 Riar Geer, Colorado (Coaches-2)

Receivers
 Jordan Shipley, Texas (Coaches-1; Media-1)
 Denario Alexander, Missouri (Coaches-1; Media-1)
 Dezmon Briscoe, Kansas (Coaches-1; Media-1)
 Ryan Broyles, Oklahoma (Coaches-2)
 Kerry Meier, Kansas (Coaches-2)
 Brandon Banks, Kansas State (Coaches-2)

Defensive selections

Defensive linemen
 Gerald McCoy, Oklahoma (Coaches-1; Media-1)
 Von Miller, Texas A&M (Coaches-1; Media-1)
 Ndamukong Suh, Nebraska (Coaches-1; Media-1)
 Brandon Sharpe, Texas Tech (Coaches-1)
 Jared Crick, Nebraska (Coaches-1)
 Sergio Kindle, Texas (Coaches-2)
 Lamarr Houston, Texas (Coaches-2)
 Jeremy Beal, Oklahoma (Coaches-2)
 Jaron Baston, Missouri (Coaches-2)
 Daniel Howard, Texas Tech (Coaches-2)

Linebackers
 Sean Weatherspoon, Missouri (Coaches-1; Media-1)

Defensive backs
 Perrish Cox, Oklahoma State (Coaches-1; Media-1)
 Earl Thomas, Texas (Coaches-1; Media-1)
 Prince Amukamara, Nebraska (Coaches-1; Media-2)

Special teams

Kickers
 Grant Ressel, Missouri (Coaches-1; Media-1)
 Alex Henery, Nebraska (Coaches-2; Media-2)

Punters
 Derek Epperson, Baylor (Coaches-1; Media-1)
 Tress Way, Oklahoma (Coaches-2; Media-2)

All-purpose / Return specialists
 Brandon Banks, Kansas State (Coaches-1)
 Perrish Cox, Oklahoma State (Coaches-2)

Key
Bold = selected as a first-team player by both the coaches and media panel

Coaches = selected by Big 12 Conference coaches

Media = selected by a media panel

See also
2009 College Football All-America Team

References

All-Big 12 Conference
All-Big 12 Conference football teams